Jill Marie Schoelen (born March 21, 1963) is an American former actress. She is best known for Chiller (1985), The Stepfather (1987), Cutting Class (1989), The Phantom of the Opera (1989), Popcorn (1991), Rich Girl (1991), and When a Stranger Calls Back (1993). For her numerous horror film appearances, she is widely regarded as a scream queen.

Career
Schoelen’s theatrical debut was in the 1981 TV pilot The Best of Times, which starred Crispin Glover and Nicolas Cage. Schoelen went on to star in such movies as D.C. Cab (1983), Chiller (1985), That Was Then... This Is Now (1985), Babes in Toyland (1986), The Stepfather (1987), Billionaire Boys Club (1987 TV miniseries), Cutting Class (1989), The Phantom of the Opera (1989), Popcorn (1991), When a Stranger Calls Back (1993), and There Goes My Baby (1994).

She guest starred on episodes of T. J. Hooker, Little House on the Prairie, Murder, She Wrote, Diagnosis: Murder,  Sara, Hell Town, and Aaron Spelling’s The Heights (1992). In 1988, Sean Penn cast her in a dramatic play he wrote and directed, The Kindness of Women. Schoelen and Penn worked together again on stage, starring opposite each other in David Rabe’s Hurlyburly (1988/1989), in a production that David Rabe also directed.

In 2009, she released her debut album, Kelly’s Smile, a jazz album that is composed of songs related to her childhood friend, Kelly Troup, who grew up across the street from Schoelen.

Personal life
Schoelen was born in Burbank, California. She dated Keanu Reeves during the time they starred in Babes in Toyland (1986). She was engaged to Brad Pitt for three months in 1989. In 1993, Schoelen married film composer Anthony Marinelli, and soon after retired from her acting career to be a stay-at-home mother. Schoelen and Marinelli have two sons.

Filmography

Films

TV

Radio and podcast appearances
Schoelen appeared on Ken Reid's TV Guidance Counselor podcast on August 10, 2016.

References

External links

1963 births
Actresses from Los Angeles
American film actresses
American television actresses
Living people
People from Burbank, California
21st-century American women